James Mann is the name of:

Politicians
 James Mann (1822–1868), American legislator from Maine and U.S. Representative for Louisiana
 James Mann (Australian politician) (1892–1965), Australian state politician in Western Australia
 James Mann (South Carolina politician) (1920–2010), American soldier, lawyer and U.S. Representative from South Carolina
 James Mann, 5th Earl Cornwallis (1778–1852), British peer and Tory politician
 James Robert Mann (Illinois politician) (1856–1922), American legislator and U.S. Representative from Illinois

Others
 James Mann (cricketer) (1903–1984), Australian cricketer
 James Mann (curator) (1897–1962), British collector, surveyor and historian of art
 James Mann (writer) (born 1946), American writer

See also
 Jim Mann (baseball) (born 1974), American baseball player
Jimmy Mann (disambiguation)
 James Man (1755–1823), businessman
 Mann (surname)